The Kimberley death adder (Acanthophis cryptamydros) is a species of venomous snake in the family Elapidae native to northwestern Australia.

They cited a 1981 paper by Glen Milton Storr, who had written about death adders of Western Australia. Storr considered both Kimberley and Cape York populations as northern death adder (A. praelongus), and Wells and Wellington noted the description was restricted to the Kimberley population and renamed it as a new species. The monograph was criticised for new species having no or minimal descriptions. Ken P. Aplin and Steve C. Donnellan called the name a nomen nudum as neither Wells and Wellington's nor Storr's notes distinguished the new taxon from the northern death adder.

Simon Maddock and colleagues analysed the Kimberley death adder genetically and found that it was a distinct lineage, more closely related to the desert death adder (A. pyrrhus), and named it  Acanthophis cryptamydros in 2015, as they proposed that A. lancasteri was a nomen nudum. Wellington countered that their 1985 name was in fact valid.

Australian official sources recognise lancasteri, whereas Integrated Taxonomic Information System (ITIS) recognises cryptamydros as the valid name.

The Kimberley death adder is a stocky snake with a pear-shaped head that reaches  in length. It is a light orange-brown on its back and sides, with darker brown cross-bands, each of which has darker margins. It has distinctive creamy white underparts. It can be distinguished from other Australian death adders by the numbers of scales: 22 or 23 rows of midbody scales, 125–139 ventrals, undivided prefrontal scales, and the rear edge of its frontal scale not extending beyond rear edge of supraoculars, supraoculars flared laterally, 
area of lower secondary temporal scale equal to or smaller than sixth supralabial, anterior dorsal scales with prominent keels.

It is found from Wotjulum to Kununurra in northwestern Australia.

References 

Acanthophis
Reptiles described in 2015
Reptiles of Western Australia
Snakes of Australia